Air Marshal Sir John Stanley Travers Bradley,  (11 April 1888 – 6 January 1982) was a senior Royal Air Force officer who became Air Officer Commanding-in-Chief RAF Maintenance Command.

RAF career
Bradley served with the East Yorkshire Regiment and then the Machine Gun Corps during the First World War, transferring to the Royal Air Force in August 1918. He was appointed Officer Commanding No. 14 Squadron in 1921 and Station Commander at RAF Northolt in 1930. Promoted to group captain in July 1931, Bradley went on to be Senior Air Staff Officer at Headquarters Wessex Bombing Area in November 1931, Director of Equipment at the Air Ministry in 1935, Air Officer Commanding-in-Chief Maintenance Command in 1938. He continued in that role during the Second World War, though he moved on to be Deputy Air Member for Supply & Organisation in 1942 before retiring at the end of the war.

References

1888 births
1982 deaths
British Army personnel of World War I
Commanders of the Order of the British Empire
East Yorkshire Regiment officers
Knights Commander of the Order of the Bath
Machine Gun Corps officers
People from Cork (city)
Royal Air Force air marshals of World War II
Royal Air Force personnel of World War I
Royal Flying Corps officers
Military personnel from County Cork